R350 road may refer to:
 R350 road (Ireland)
 R350 road (South Africa)